The 12647 / 12648 Kongu Express is a Superfast weekly train run by Indian Railways between  and . The train was named after the Kongu region of Tamil Nadu, called Kongu Nadu. The train made its inaugural run on 3 April 2000.

Service

Time Table

Coach
The Kongu Express has rake sharing arrangement with the train no. 12681/82 Coimbatore–Chennai Central Superfast Express.
Despite its long-distance run of 47 hours, the train continues to operate without a pantry car and food gets loaded onto the train at en-route stations.

Traction

Both trains are hauled by Erode-based WAP-7 electric locomotive from Coimbatore Junction until . Then a Krishnarajapuram-based WDP-4D takes the train until  handing over to a Lallaguda-based WAP-7 locomotive from Kacheguda till Hazrat Nizamuddin and vice versa.

See also

 Kongu Nadu
 Coimbatore
 Coimbatore Junction

Coach composition

The train has standard LHB rakes with max speed of 130 kmph.

 2 AC II Tier
 6 AC III Tier
 6 Sleeper coaches
 4 General
 2 End-on Generators

References

External links
 Kongu Express/12647 Time Table
 Kongu Express/12648 Time Table

Transport in Delhi
Express trains in India
Named passenger trains of India
Transport in Coimbatore
Rail transport in Uttar Pradesh
Rail transport in Madhya Pradesh
Rail transport in Maharashtra
Rail transport in Telangana
Rail transport in Delhi
Rail transport in Tamil Nadu
Rail transport in Karnataka
Railway services introduced in 2000